The Gesellschaft Süd-Kamerun was a private trading corporation formed in 1898, facilitated by governor Jesko von Puttkamer, to run the rubber and ivory trade in the southeast of the German colony of Kamerun.

See also

 List of trading companies

References

See also
Gesellschaft Nordwest-Kamerun

External links
 

Trading companies
Kamerun
Companies established in 1898
1898 establishments in the German colonial empire
Chartered companies
Companies based in Hamburg